RTC X roads or RTC cross roads is a road and one of the major commercial centers in Hyderabad, Telangana, India.

Commercial area
RTC x roads is known for the presence of the major movie theaters. All the major Tollywood new releases open here. Some notable ones include Sandhya 70 mm and 35 mm, Sri Mayuri 70 mm, Sudarshan 35 mm, Devi 70 mm, Sapthagiri 70 mm, Usha mayuri 70mm, Sri sai raja 70mm and more.

The famous Hyderabadi restaurants, Bawaarchi and Astoria are located here. 
The other name for RTC X Roads is Charminar Chowrasta, got this name because of the Charminar Cigarette Factory Nearby VST (Vazeer Sultan Industries).

Transport
TSRTC runs buses connecting to the area with all parts of the city. It is close to Secunderabad.

The closest MMTS train station is at Vidyanagar or Jamia Osmania.

References

Neighbourhoods in Hyderabad, India